Birendranath Sasmal (বীরেন্দ্রনাথ শাসমল) (26 October 1881 - 24 November 1934) was a lawyer and political leader. He was known as "The Uncrowned King" of Midnapore and "Deshpran" because of his love and work for the country and for his efforts in the Swadeshi movement.

Early life
Birendranath Sasmal was born in Contai, in undivided Midnapore district. His father was a Mahishya Zamindar Biswambhar Sasmal and mother Anandamoyee Devi. He passed the Entrance Examination in 1900 and got admission into Metropolitan College, Calcutta and then transferred to Ripon College of Calcutta as he was influenced by Surendranath Banerjee. After finishing his college he went to England to study law at the Middle Temple; during this time he visited United States and Japan. He returned to India after becoming a barrister.

Revolutionary activities
For political reasons, Midnapore district was proposed to divided into two by British Raj and Biren Sasmal started protesting against it. He toured the region and organised protest movements. The proposal for partition was withdrawn.
He started practising law at Calcutta High Court in 1904. In 1913 leaving Calcutta High Court, Birendranath practiced in Midnapore District Court for a few years but later he again joined the High Court. In the High Court, he defended the accused in the Chittagong Armed Robbery case. He was jailed for nine-month by British Raj for calling a general strike during the visit of King George V to British India. During his stay at Presidency Jail he wrote his autobiography named Sroter Trina. He considered politics to be synonymous with social welfare and took a pivotal role as a relief worker during the Midnapore floods of 1913, 1920, 1926 and 1933.

Non-Cooperation Movement (1920)

Sasmal played a leading role in the 1920 Calcutta Session of the National Congress  and supported the resolution of non-cooperation movement of1921. Sasmal, by then, had joined the Swarajya Party of Chittaranjan Das. On his return from Nagpur Session, he left his lucrative profession and played a pivotal role in the Non-cooperation movement. He was made Secretary of the Bengal Provincial Congress. During this period he also successfully led the local anti-Union Board agitation in Midnapore.

No-Tax Movement (1920–1922 )
Bengal Village Self Government Act was passed in 1919. According to that law, 227 Union Boards were formed in the district. Birendranath took up the cause of his people, and plunged into Boycott Movement. He declared that he would walk on bare feet until the Union Boards were not done away with. On 17 December 1921, 226 Union Boards were abolished and the last one was abolished the next year. In a gathering, with loud cheers, people put shoes on the feet of their leader.

Labon Satyagraha (1930)
Birendranath's was also involved in the movement. His followers took active part in organizing people. Satyagrahis came to Narghat and Pichhhaboni to break Salt Law by peaceful means. The Satyagraha assumed the form of a mass movement in the area.

Civil Disobedience Movement, Election to Calcutta Corporation, Central Legislative Assembly (1930-1934)
During the Civil disobedience movement of 1930, he courted arrest. On his release he rushed to Chittagong to defend the accused in the Armoury Raid Case (1930) without charging any fees. Again in 1932 he acted as a defence lawyer in the Douglas shooting case. He joined the Calcutta Conference held under the auspices of the Congress Nationalist party to oppose Ramsay MacDonald's 'Communal Award'. 
In 1933, Birendranath was elected to Calcutta Corporation. At the request of Pandit Madan Mohan Malavia, he contested in Central Legislative Assembly election from a two–district seat of Burdwan division and won it but he breathed his last before the result was announced.

Death 
Birendranath Sasmal died of heart attack on 24 November 1934 at the age of 53.

Legacy
Birendranath Sasmal was an ardent follower of Mahatma Gandhi and had unflinching faith in Non-Violent movement. He thought-violence begets violence. Sasmal used to say, "For whom shall I live if not for the people?". He had some bitter experience in politics, but people loved him. A road in South Kolkata (Deshparan Sasmal Road) is named after him. Deshapran community development block in Kanthi subdivision is named after Sasmal. Many Schools, Clubs, Organisations and streets that bear his name indicate his permanent seat in the heart of people.

See also 
Deshapran Mahavidyalaya
Deshapran railway station

References

External links
 
Deshparan Birendranath Sasmal

Bengali people
1881 births
1934 deaths
Members of the Central Legislative Assembly of India
Surendranath College alumni
University of Calcutta alumni
Surendranath Law College alumni
Lawyers in British India